Cerano is a comune (municipality) in the Province of Novara in the Italian region Piedmont, located about  northeast of Turin and about  southeast of Novara.

Cerano borders the following municipalities: Abbiategrasso, Boffalora sopra Ticino, Cassolnovo, Magenta, Robecco sul Naviglio, Sozzago, and Trecate.

The Renaissance painter Giovanni Battista Crespi is known as il Cerano because he resided here.

References

External links
 Official website

Cities and towns in Piedmont